Jewish News Syndicate (JNS) is an English language newswire service focusing on the Jewish world and Israel launched in September 2011 as Jewish News Service and published by Russel Pergament and Josh Katzen. Its editor-in-chief is American journalist Jonathan S. Tobin.

Finances
Sheldon Adelson and his family are the largest contributors to JNS. By 2015, the Adelson Family Foundation had contributed over $1.2 million: $300 thousand in 2013 (65% of JNS revenue that year), $450k in 2014, and commitment to another $450k in 2015.

In 2015, Adam Milstein donated $12,500.

In 2013, Pergament said that JNS had around 40 subscribers, that around a quarter of them used its free year-long "trial period", and that the rest paid from $400–700 per month. At that time, Pergament said that some papers paid JNS in advertising space instead of in cash. In 2015, Pergament said that between 40 and 55 newspapers subscribed to the JNS syndication service. Of those, around a third used the "trial period" by which they could use JNS articles for free for up to a year, while the rest paid as much as $500 per month. This rate was much cheaper than the Jewish Telegraphic Agency syndication rate for newspapers.

Positions

In 2015, The Forward described JNS as focusing heavily on Israeli security threats. Frequent columnists Ben Cohen and Stephen M. Flatow wrote often against the Iran Nuclear Deal and the Obama administration more generally, and the JNS board included Middle East Forum president and pro-Israel hawk Daniel Pipes and neoconservative Harvard professor Ruth Wisse.

Publisher Russel Pergament stated in 2014 that "some papers choose to use us versus anybody else because they think we are more respectful of Israel’s challenge. Other editors prefer us because we’re less expensive. And I’ll take either," as quoted in The Forward, a mainstream Jewish newspaper. "JNS is a nonpartisan, objective, straight down the middle newswire with no axe to grind except one: to see that Israel gets a fair shake in the news," Pergament told the Forward. "There are some editors who do not want to upset their readers so they’ll publish a JNS news brief about someone in Israel inventing a new flavor of ice cream, but they won’t run anything that’s kind of scary," he told the Jewish Press.

In August 2019 Ron Kampeas of the Jewish Telegraphic Agency described JNS as "conservative".

History 
The wire service was launched in September 2011.

The editor-in-chief until 2016 was Jacob Kamaras.

References

External links 

 
Newspapers
Newspapers
Newspapers